Yulian Mitrofanovich Rukavishnikov (30 September 1922, Moscow – 14 December 2000, Moscow) was a Russian sculptor, and a full member of the Russian Academy of Arts. He enjoyed a long and successful career spanning about 50 years with works ranging from medals to large monuments and high reliefs, yet he was mostly known for his sculptures of Vladimir Lenin, which were installed both within and outside of the Soviet Union. 

Rukavishnikov's father Mitrofan, wife Angelina, son Aleksandr, and grandson Filip, were also prominent Russian sculptors.

Biography

 

Rukavishnikov was related to the writer Vladimir Nabokov through Nabokov's mother, Yelena Rukavishnikova. He trained in a flight school together with Vasily Stalin, the son of Joseph Stalin. It was Vasily, who recommended Rukavishnikov to Stalin for creating a bust of Stalin's mother at the Mtatsminda Pantheon in Tbilisi, Georgia. Rukavishnikov was then just an art school student, yet Stalin came to like his work. 

Rukavishnikov's father Mitrofan, wife Angelina, son Aleksandr, and grandson Filip, were also prominent Russian sculptors.

During one of his first individual flights at the aviation school, Rukavishnikov's plane stalled at a height of ca. 30 meters, and hard-crashed to the ground. Rukavishnikov sustained a heavy injury to his head; he consequently resigned from the flight school and pursued a sculptor career.

Work
Rukavishnikov used various materials, including bronze, marble and clay, without preference to any of them. His works ranged from medals to high reliefs and upscale monuments. He was mostly known to outsiders for his depictions of prominent personalities, yet his private, studio work focused on nature and small animals. Approximately 12 of his sculptures are featured in the Tretyakov Gallery in Moscow. His other major works include the following:
Bust of Keke Geladze at the Mtatsminda Pantheon in Tbilisi, Georgia
Chekhov Monument in Taganrog
 Busts of Leonid Brezhnev and Mikhail Suslov at the Kremlin Wall Necropolis
The Resurrection of Christ at the Cathedral of Christ the Saviour in Moscow

References

1922 births
2000 deaths
Artists from Moscow
20th-century Russian sculptors